Sir Rawson William Rawson,  (8 September 1812 – 20 November 1899) was a British government official and statistician. During his tenure as a public servant in Canada he contributed to the Report on the affairs of the Indians in Canada, a foundational document in the establishment of the Canadian Indian residential school system.

Early life and Board of Trade
Rawson Rawson was born in 1812, the son of the noted oculist Sir William Adams Rawson (1783-1827) and Jane Eliza  Rawson (died 1844), daughter of Colonel George Rawson of Belmont House, County Wicklow, MP for  Armagh and his wife Mary  Bowes Benson. His father, son of Henry Adams, a native of Morwenstow in Cornwall, had originally had the surname Adams, but had changed his name to Rawson in 1825 to commemorate his wife's father, and also gave it as a first name to his son.

Rawson was educated at Eton and entered the Board of Trade at the age of seventeen. He served as private secretary to three successive vice-presidents of the Board, Charles Poulett Thomson, Alexander Baring and William Ewart Gladstone.

Colonial service (1842–1875)
In 1842, having served Gladstone for one year he was appointed Civil Secretary to the then Governor-General of Canada Charles Bagot. The same year he was appointed by Bagot, along with John Davidson and William Hepburn as commissioners for a report regarding government policies and expenditures related to Indigenous peoples in Canada East and Canada West. Completed in 1844, the final report, titled the Report on the affairs of the Indians in Canada, included a call for the introduction of industrial schools to address the noted failure of day schools to effectively keep Indigenous children from the influence of their parents. The report is regarded as a foundational document in the rationale for establishing the Canadian Indian residential school system. In 1846, following his work on the report, Rawson was appointed treasurer and paymaster-general to Mauritius.

In 1854 he became colonial secretary in the Cape of Good Hope, which had just formed its first locally elected parliament. Soon after accepting this post, he was awarded a CB, and attained considerable local fame for his overly elaborate dress of lace collars, cuffs and buttons. Whilst in the Cape, he was exceptionally involved in the study of ferns and other plants, in the establishment of the South African Museum, as well as in the details of parliamentary procedure. However, his abilities as a financier were repeatedly questioned, as the Cape government became severely indebted and eventually entered a recession. Parliamentary writer Richard William Murray records that in both Mauritius and the Cape Colony, Rawson had left the state "as nearly bankrupt as it is possible for a British dependency to be". Rawson was also notable for being among the government officials who supported the early movement for "responsible government" in the Cape, and therefore supported the handing over of power to a locally elected executive, to replace imperial officials like himself. He was retired from the post on 21 July 1864, to be succeeded by Sir Richard Southey.

He retired from public office in 1875. He was elected to the American Philosophical Society the year before, in 1874.

Statistical Society and later life
He was president of the Statistical Society (now called the Royal Statistical Society) (1884–1886), an organisation of which he was a staunch supporter. He had originally joined the Society in March 1835, and briefly held the post of editor of the Society's Journal, from 1837 to 1842.

On his retirement from public office, he was re-elected to the Society's Council in 1876 and remained in the post till his death. It was largely due to the efforts of Rawson that the society received its charter of incorporation in 1887. He was also the founding president of the International Statistical Institute.

Family
Rawson married in 1849 Sophia Mary-Anne Ward, daughter of the Reverend Henry Ward, vicar of Killinchy, County  Down and sister of the New Zealand-based politician Crosbie Ward. They had had eight children, including Herbert Rawson (1852–1924) and William Rawson (1854–1932).

References

 Obituary in Journal of the Royal Statistical Society, LXII (1899), 677–679.

Presidents of the International Statistical Institute
1812 births
1899 deaths
British civil servants
British statisticians
Presidents of the Royal Statistical Society
People educated at Eton College
British Mauritius people
Chief secretaries (British Empire)
Residential schools in Canada